Cloud Chief may refer to:

 "Cloud-Chief", an 1910 intermezzo composed by J. Ernest Philie
 Cloud Chief, Oklahoma, an unincorporated community in Washita County, Oklahoma